Para-Mongolic is a proposed group of languages that is considered to be an extinct sister branch of the Mongolic languages. Para-Mongolic contains certain historically attested extinct languages, among them Khitan and Tuyuhun.

Languages 

The languages of the Xiongnu, Donghu and Wuhuan might be Para-Mongolic, as might those of the Xianbei and the Tuoba (the founders of the Northern Wei) and Khitan. Because the surviving evidence for Xianbei and Tuoba is very sparse, one can only hypothesize that a genetic relationship could be possible. In the case of Khitan, there is rich evidence, but most of it is written in the two Khitan scripts (large and small) that have yet to be fully deciphered. However, from the available evidence it has been concluded that a genetic relationship to Mongolic is likely.

Tuoba 

Alexander Vovin (2007) identifies the extinct Tuoba language (Tabγač) as a Mongolic language. However, Chen (2005) argues that Tuoba was a Turkic language.

Shimunek classifies Tuoba as a "Serbi" (i.e., para-Mongolic) language, along with Tuyuhun and Khitan.

Ruanruan 

Alexander Vovin (2018) suggests that the Ruanruan language of the Rouran Khaganate was a Mongolic language, close but not identical to Middle Mongolian.

Khitan 

Juha Janhunen (2006) classified the Khitan language into the "Para-Mongolic" family, meaning that it is related to the Mongolic languages as a sister group, rather than as a direct descendant of Proto-Mongolic. Alexander Vovin (2017) has also identified several possible loanwords from Koreanic languages into the Khitan language.

Tuyuhun 

Vovin (2015) identified the extinct Tuyuhun language as a Para-Mongolic language.

Internal classification 
Shimunek (2017) proposes a "Serbi–Awar" group of languages that is a sister branch of the Mongolic languages. Together, the Serbi–Awar and Mongolic languages make up the Serbi–Mongolic languages in Shimunek's classification.

Serbi–Mongolic
Mongolic
Serbi–Awar (= Juha Janhunen's "Para-Mongolic")
Awar (Avar) (Wuhuan 烏桓 or Wuwan 烏丸)
Old Serbi (Common Serbi)
Ch’i-fu/Qifu 乞伏 (northern Early Middle Chinese/NEMC *kʰɨrbuwk)
Tuan/Duan 段 (NEMC *dɔr̃)
Taghbach
Tuyuhun/T’u-yü-hun (Mu-jung/Murong 慕容)
Kitanic (Yü-wen/Yuwen 宇文)
Old Kitan
Qay 奚 (NEMC *ɣay)
Shirwi proper 室韋 (*širwi/*širβi < *serbi 鮮卑 'Xianbei')

See also 
Xianbei
Donghu people

References

Bibliography 

 
 
 

Mongolic–Khitan languages